Coal Hill may refer to:

 Coal Hill, Arkansas
 Coal Hill, Ohio
 A hill located in Jingshan Park to the north of the Forbidden City in Beijing
 Coal Hill in McCone County, Montana
 Coal Hill Coal Railroad, a railroad in Mt Washington, Pittsburgh, Pennsylvania
 Coal Hill School, a fictional London school in the Doctor Who universe

See also
Coleshill  (disambiguation)